The 2017 Kenyan Premier League (known as the SportPesa Premier League for sponsorship reasons) is the 14th season of the Kenyan Premier League since it began in 2003, and the 54th season of top-division football in Kenya since 1963. It began on 11 March and is scheduled to end on 18 November. Tusker were the defending champions, going into the season on the back of their 11th league title.

The Kenyan Premier League was expanded to 18 teams, of which 14 returned from the 2016 season. Kariobangi Sharks, Nakumatt, Nzoia Sugar (formerly Nzoia United) and Zoo Kericho were promoted from the second-tier National Super League.

On 21 October 2017, Gor Mahia secured their record 16th league title with four games to spare after beating Ulinzi Stars 3–1 at the Kericho Green Stadium.

Changes from last season

Relegated from Premier League
 Nairobi City Stars
 Ushuru

Promoted from National Super League
 Kariobangi Sharks
 Nakumatt
 Nzoia Sugar (formerly Nzoia United)
 Zoo Kericho

Teams
Seven of the participating teams are based in the capital, Nairobi, while Bandari is the only team based at the Coast.

Stadia and locations

League table

Positions by round

The table lists the positions of teams after each week of matches. In order to preserve chronological evolvements, any postponed matches are not included to the round at which they were originally scheduled, but added to the full round they were played immediately afterwards. For example, if a match is scheduled for matchday 13, but then postponed and played between days 16 and 17, it will be added to the standings for day 16.

Results

Top scorers

Hat-tricks

References

Kenya
Kenya
1
2017